Izzatnagar is a locality in Bareilly in the Indian state of  Uttar Pradesh. The railway station it houses is one of the three Divisional Headquarters of North Eastern Railways. Izzatnagar is also the location of the Indian Veterinary Research Institute (IVRI), Central Avian Research Institute (CARI), Railway Mechanical Workshop [Established in year 1913], Diesel Loco Shed and Hartmann College.

Izzatnagar also houses the famous Trishul Air-base of Indian Air Force.

History
It is named after Sir Alexander Izat (1844–1920), a Scottish engineer and director of the Bengal and North Western Railway. He specialized in Bridge Engineering and came to Izzatnagar in 1896.

Famous attractions
 Dhopeshwar Nath temple 
 Trivti Nathan temple
Railway Officers Colony – Road no. 2, Izzatnagar. (It contains 12 Bungalows, on a 1 Kilometre long road, that age back to 1900s and are still in use by current bureaucrats and highly reputed Indian government officers.) 
 Indian Veterinary Research Institute, Izzatnagar.
 Izzatnagar Kalibari, Krishna Nagar (Established in 1970)
 Shiv Parvati Temple
 ST. PAUL Church
 St. Lawrence Church (Established in 1966)
 Masihi Kalisiya Church, Defence Colony, Izzatnagar
 Balaji (Vishnu) Temple, Rajendra-nagar, Izzatnagar.
 Funcity, Pilibhit bypass road.
 Sai Baba Mandir
 Bada Bagh Hanuman Mandir

Education 
Gulab Rai Montessori (GRM)Vidyalaya AFS, Bareilly,
Kendriya Vidyalaya IVRI, Bareilly, 
Kendriya Vidyalaya NER, Bareilly
Sacred hearts sr. Sec. Public school, Bareilly.
Jai Narayan S V M Inter college, Bareilly.

Nearby Places
 Nainital – 143 km
 Pilibhit – 51 km
 Pantnagar – 63 km
 Almora – 184 km
 Muradabad – 110 km
 Budaun – 55 km
 Faridpur – 23 km
 Ghunsi Aonla Uttar Pradesh – 50 km

References 

Neighbourhoods in Bareilly